is a Japanese manga artist and animation character designer.

Professional career
Born in Kumamoto, Kumamoto Prefecture, Sonoda moved to Tokyo in 1984, at the age of 21, and began work at Artmic, an anime studio. During this time, he worked on Bubblegum Crisis, producing the original Knight Saber character designs. He also worked on Gall Force, for which he did the original character designs.

He worked at Artmic until 1991, when he began work on the manga series Gunsmith Cats. Gunsmith Cats is one of Sonoda's best known works, being both a Harvey and Tezuka award nominee. Sonoda concluded Gunsmith Cats run in 1997, when he put the comic on hiatus, and began work on Cannon God Exaxxion. In 2004, after finishing Cannon God Exaxxion, he returned to work on Gunsmith Cats, with the follow-up sequel, Gunsmith Cats Burst.

He is currently the 19th head of the wagashi confectionery shop "Sonoda-ya" in Kumamoto, established in 1582. Sonoda created a new product, its first in 115 years, by adding lemon peels to his family's existing chōsen-ame candies and providing his own bishōjo illustrations for the packaging.

Personal life
Sonoda is a self-confessed gun fanatic, owning several replica guns.

Works

Manga
 Riding Bean (1988–1989; cancelled with the magazine)
 Gunsmith Cats (1991–1997)
 Cannon God Exaxxion (1997–2004)
 Gunsmith Cats BURST (2004–2008)
 Bullet the Wizard (2010–2013)

Animation
 Wanna-Be's (1986)—character concept design
 Gall Force: First Story Arc (1986)—character design
 Gall Force: Rhea Arc (1989)—character design
 Gall Force: Earth Chapter Arc (1989)—character design
 Gall Force: New Era Arc (1991)—character design
 Bubblegum Crisis (1987-1991)—character and mecha design
 Royal Space Force: The Wings of Honneamise (1987)—production design
 Riding Bean (1989) original story, character design
 Bubblegum Crash (1991)—character design
 Otaku no Video (1991)—character design
 Gunsmith Cats (1995-1996)—original story, character design
 Idol Janshi Suchie-Pai (1996)—original character design
 Solty Rei (2005)—conceptual design

Video games
Sol Bianca
Suchie-Pai The Idol Fighter series (1993–ongoing)
Neon Genesis Evangelion Eva to Yukai na Nakamitachi Datsuihokankeikaku
Temho Painyan

References

External links 
 A Dark Horse interview with Sonoda
 Interview at EX.org
  2017 Q&A with Kenichi Sonoda on J!-ENT
 
 

1962 births
Anime character designers
Living people
Manga artists
People from Kumamoto
Mechanical designers (mecha)
Video game artists